Leeds Arts University is a specialist arts further and higher education institution, based in the city of Leeds, West Yorkshire, England, with a main campus opposite the University of Leeds.

History 
 
It was founded in 1846 as the Leeds School of Art. From 1968 to 1993 it was known as Jacob Kramer College, after Jacob Kramer, having lost part of its provision to Leeds Polytechnic (the future Leeds Beckett University). It was known as Leeds College of Art and Design until 2009, and then as Leeds College of Art. In August 2017, the school was granted university status and the name was changed to Leeds Arts University.

Locations

The University today has city centre sites at Blenheim Walk and at Vernon Street.

Academic profile

Further education courses

 Extended Diploma in Creative Practice 
 Foundation Diploma in Art & Design - one of the largest in the country, with 280 students validated by the University of the Arts London

Undergraduate courses
 BA (Hons) Animation
 BA (Hons) Comic & Concept Art
 BA (Hons) Creative Advertising
 BA (Hons) Creative Writing
 BA (Hons) Fashion Branding with Communication
 BA (Hons) Fashion Design
 BA (Hons) Fashion Photography
 BA (Hons) Filmmaking
 BA (Hons) Fine Art
 BA (Hons) Graphic Design
 BA (Hons) Illustration
 BA (Hons) Photography
 BMus (Hons) Popular Music Performance
 BA (Hons) Textile Design
 BA (Hons) Visual Communication

Postgraduate courses

 MA Animation
 MA Creative Practice
 MA Curation Practices
 MA Creative Practice
 MA Fine Art
 MA Graphic Design
 MA Illustration and Graphic Novel
 MA Photography
 MA Worldbuilding and Creature Design

Student body

Out of  UK higher education institutions, it is the  largest.

Notable alumni

 Norman Ackroyd, artist
 Sam Ainsley, artist
 Kenneth Armitage, sculptor
 James Bateman, painter
 Glen Baxter, artist
 Trevor Bell, artist
 Alison Britton, ceramics tutor at the Royal College of Art
 Henry Carr, painter and war artist
 Michael Chapman, guitarist, musician and singer
 Paul Clark, musician
 Elisabeth Collins, painter and sculptor
 Raymond Coxon, painter
 Diz Disley, musician and graphic artist
 Leigh Francis, comedian
 Marcus Harvey, painter
 Barbara Hepworth, sculptor
 Damien Hirst, 1995 Turner Prize winner
 Jocelyn Horner, sculptor
 Thomas Houseago, sculptor
 Percy Hague Jowett (1882–1955), artist and arts administrator
 Vivien Knight, art historian and gallerist 
 Jacob Kramer, painter
 Edna Lumb, painter 
 Henry Moore, sculptor
 Peter Murphy, Stuckist artist
 Stass Paraskos, painter and founder of the Cyprus College of Art
 Bob Peck, actor
 Vivian Pitchforth, artist
 Victor Sloan, visual artist
 Bernard Schottlander, sculptor
 Ria Sharma, founder of Make Love Not Scars
 Georgina Starr, artist
 Cecil Stephenson, artist
 Frankie Vaughan, singer
 Hilda Annetta Walker, artist
 Harold Sandys Williamson, painter
 Trevor Winkfield, painter and writer
 Joash Woodrow, painter

References

External links
 University site
 LCAD University and College Union (UCU) Branch
 Exhibitions information

 
Animation schools in the United Kingdom
Art museums and galleries in West Yorkshire
Educational institutions established in 1846
1846 establishments in England
1846 in art
Leeds Blue Plaques